Christopher Raeburn may refer to:
 Christopher Raeburn (producer)
 Christopher Raeburn (designer)